Richard Banta (1925 - February 9, 2007) was an American architect who designed houses in Los Angeles, California.

References

1925 births
2007 deaths
Architects from Los Angeles
20th-century American architects
Date of birth missing
Place of birth missing
Place of death missing